Vijaybhoomi University is a private university located in Karjat, Maharashtra, India. It was established in 2018 by an Act of the State Legislature of Maharashtra. It is recognized by the University Grants Commission (UGC) under Section 22 of UGC Act.

Overview 
The University was established on 17 December 2018 through the Vijaybhoomi University, Raigad Act, 2018 as a liberal professional university. It offers undergraduate and postgraduate programs in the fields of business administration, commerce, engineering, law design and music. The university pursues collaborations with ESCP Business School and INSOFE.

Schools 
It comprises six schools, JAGSOM, Vijaybhoomi Law School, INSOFE School of Data Science, Vijaybhoomi School of Arts and Humanities, Vijaybhoomi School of Design and the True School of Music.

Accreditation 
The university is recognized by University Grants Commission.

References 

Universities in Maharashtra